Akiane Kramarik (born July 9, 1994) is an American poet and painter. She began drawing at the age of four. Kramarik's best-known painting is Prince of Peace, which she completed at the age of eight.

Early life 

Akiane Kramarik was born on July 9, 1994, in Mount Morris, Illinois, to a Lithuanian mother and a non-practicing Catholic American father. Kramarik professed she saw the face of Jesus Christ in her visions. Her education began at a parochial  school, but she was later homeschooled. Regarding her influences and motivation, she states:

Paintings
Kramarik is a self-taught painter and says that Jesus spoke to her when she was four years old, encouraging her to draw and paint her visions. She began to draw at the age of four, was painting at six, and began to write poetry at seven. At the age of 8 years old, Akiane painted Jesus. Her first completed self-portrait sold for US$10,000.

Kramarik's paintings are often allegorical as well as spiritual, involving likenesses of Jesus, children, and animals, as well as self-portraits. She often draws inspiration from magazine pictures. However, according to Kramarik, her main inspiration comes from her visions of Heaven and her religious experiences. By age 12, she had completed sixty large paintings. Some of her works have been purchased by the US Embassy in Singapore. She has completed over 200 artworks and 800 literary works and has published two best-selling books.

At the age of 10, Kramarik appeared on The Oprah Winfrey Show. At the age of 12, she appeared on CNN. She appeared in the 68th episode of The Late Late Show with Craig Ferguson in 2005 and the 21st episode of Katie in 2012.

Prince of Peace

Kramarik has said Prince of Peace is her "favorite portrait" and one of her most memorable paintings. At age eight she had long been seeking the right face to help her paint an image from her dreams and visions when a family friend brought to her a carpenter as a possible subject. The man's face closely resembled what Kramarik remembered as the face of Jesus. She completed the portrait in 40 hours of intensive work. Not long after, it was shipped to her agent for exhibition, who then stole it and sold it without permission. For sixteen years the original painting was held locked in a bank vault, with the then-owner unwilling either to show or to sell it. In December 2019, Prince of Peace was recovered by the artist's family and sold to a private collector for $850,000.

At the age of four, Colton Burpo, whose story was featured in the best-selling book Heaven Is for Real and the film adaptation of the same name, underwent a critical operation after his appendix burst.  Although it was not a near-death experience (his heart never stopped), he did say he had an experience of visiting Heaven and had visions of Jesus. Years later, when he saw Kramarik's Prince of Peace on TV, he told his father "Dad, that one’s right."

Bibliography

References

External links
 
 
 

1994 births
Living people
Child artists
American child writers
 American people of Lithuanian descent
 American women painters
 American women poets
 Painters from Illinois
 People from Mount Morris, Illinois
Visionary artists
21st-century American women artists
21st-century American poets